Antoni Milkowski (1935–2001) was an American minimalist sculptor.

Biography
Antoni "Tony" Milkowski was born October 7, 1935, in Evanston, Illinois. He was also known as "Antek", particularly by his family. When he was two years old, the family moved to New York City. He attended Kenyon College where he received a degree in biology in 1957. For a time, he considered pursuing a career in medicine, taking additional science courses at Columbia University. Instead, in 1958, he enlisted in the United States Marine Corps Officers Candidate Program. While stationed in San Diego, California, he took drawing and art history courses at the University of California, Berkeley, extension program.

Discharged from the Marine Corps in 1961, Milkowski returned to New York and worked for a time as a recreation leader for the NYC Parks Department. The following year, he enrolled in an M.A. program at Hunter College. He worked on and off in the Queens parks during this time and also taught at the Lost Battalion Hall Recreation Center.

In 1963, while at Hunter College, Milkowski began studying with Tony Smith, Ad Reinhardt, Michael Ponce de Leon, George Sugarman and Eugene Goossen. His interactions with these artists, in addition to his meeting David Smith, cemented his desire to pursue sculpture.

It was in 1964–1965, while a Fulbright Scholar in Poland (where he also taught at the Academy of Fine Arts in Warsaw), that Milkowski was invited to participate in the Biennial of Forms in Space, where he created his first major large-scale public work entitled "Poland Column". During this period, he began to develop his aesthetic of merging geometry and repetition, mainly in modular units and generally in steel. Over the years, he refined his methods and became interested in the concept of negative space and of the three-dimensional form in space.

The sculpture Salem No. 7, from 1968, exemplifies these ideas. The piece consists of seven rectangular prisms (34″ × 34″ × 48″ each) and has a total size of 4′ high × 28′ long × 4′ deep. The massive scale is offset by its expansive and open surroundings. Additionally, the contrast between the manmade, cold material and the lushness of the landscape surrounding it create the type of contrast that Milkowski often sought in his work. When observing Seven up close, it becomes apparent that the artist used unfinished edges which brings to mind drawn edges one might see in painting. When viewing the piece from afar and from different angles, however, the user has the opportunity to see an ever-shifting work. In high light or low light, from back or front, in winter or summer, the viewer is privy to seeing something new with each successive viewing.

In 1974, Milkowski married artist and teacher Susan Hartung. They had two children together. After retiring from Hunter College, where he taught from 1966 to 1998, he lived and continued creating art in New Lebanon, New York. He died in 2001.

Permanent installations
2012		Berkshire Community College, Pittsfield MA
2012		State University of New York, Albany NY
2007		Kenyon College, Gambier OH
2006		Albany Institute of History and Art, Albany NY
2003		The Fields, Art OMI, Ghent NY
1988		Hofstra University, Hempstead, NY	
1975		Hudson Valley Community College, Troy NY
1973		Marine Midland Center, Buffalo NY
1972		Madison Square Park, NYC (moved to Bellevue Park, NYC in 2001)
1971		Hornick Factory, Haverstraw NY
1968		Area 12, Charles Center, Baltimore MD
1968		Bradley Sculpture Park, Milwaukee WI
1968		Albright-Knox Gallery, Buffalo NY
1967		The Governor Nelson A. Rockefeller Empire State Plaza Art Collection, Albany NY
1965		Elblag, Poland

Selected exhibitions
2008		SculptureNow, Lenox MA
2002		One-person Show, In Memoriam, Berkshire Community College, Pittsfield MA
2001		Contemporary Sculpture at Chesterwood '01, Stockbridge MA (Also 1996, 1991, 1985, 1982)
2001		Three-person show, Art Sites, Greenport NY
2001		Art and Mathematics, Koussevitzky Art Gallery, Pittsfield MA
2000		Museum Ball and Contemporary Art Auction, Albany Museum of History and Art, Albany NY.  (Also 1999, 1998, 1997, 1995, 1993, 1992, 1991)
1999		Set in Steel, a retrospective, Hunter College, Times Square Gallery, NYC
1999		Roundout Biennial Sculpture Exhibitions, Kingston NY. (Also 1998 and 1997)
1997		Hunter College Benefit Auction, Leubsdorf Gallery, Hunter College, NYC
1996		Hunter College Faculty Exhibition, The Art Gallery, Hunter College, NYC. (Also 1993)
1994		Sculpture at Naumkeag, Stockbridge MA
1993		The Rickey Collection of Constructivist Art, Neuberger Museum, Purchase NY
1992		Bridges, Boulevard Project-Space, Albany NY
1991		Eight Young Artists:  Then and Now – 1964 & 1991, Hunter College, NYC
1990		Two-person show, Contemporary Art, University of Slask, Cieszyn,  Poland
1988		In Memory of John Bernard Myers, Kouros Gallery, NYC
1988		Two-person show, College of Saint Rose, Albany NY
1988		Art as Act:  Representing Vietnam, Leubsdorf Gallery, Hunter College, NYC
1986		Tricentennial Salute to Sculpture, Academy Lafayette Park, Albany NY
1985		Aspects of Constructivism, The Atrium Gallery, G. E. Corporatio, Schenectady NY
1985		Steel ... The Show, The Gallery, Albany Institute of History and Art, Albany NY
1980		Wards Island Show, NYC
1979		Berkshire Community College, Pittsfield MA
1977		Seven Area Artists, Hudson Valley Community College, Troy NY	
1976		American Academy and Institute of Arts and Letters, NYC
1973-1999	sculpture on exhibit, State University of New York at Albany, Albany NY
1973		sculpture on exhibit, Tanglewood Music Center, Lenox MA
1971		John C. Myers Gallery, NYC
1970		Jewish Museum, NYC

Academic and professional honors
1990-1991		City University of New York Research Grant for large-scale sculpture
1990			Artist's Residency, Association of Norwegian Artists, Svolvaer, Norway
1990			Lecturer, Slask University, Cieszyn, Poland
1984			Artist in Residence, Washington State University, Pullman WA
1977			National Sculpture Conference, Jonesboro, Arkansas. Invited to participate in panel on scale and environment.
1976			Artist in Residence, Artpark, Lewiston NY
1974			NEA Matching Grant for Hudson Valley Community College, Troy NY
1973-1974		City University Research Grant for large-scale sculpture
1973			Inclusion in HUD publication, "Sculpture for Public Places"
1971-1972		City University of New York Research Grant for large-scale sculpture	
1968-1969		Design in Steel Awards, citation for excellence
1964-1965	    Fulbright Joint Government Grant for study in Poland. Worked in sculpture and graphics at Academy of Fine Arts, Warsaw. Conducted 	                seminars and lectures on contemporary American art.

Selected bibliography
Glueck, Grace, "Antoni Milkowski, 'Set in Steel'," New York Times, November 19, 1999
"Campus Adorned with More Sculpture this Fall," Hofstra News, September 1988, p.2
"Milkowski's Sculpture on Exhibit Now at Sutters Antiques and Art, Chatham Magazine, August 1986, p.16
Wright, Peg, "Brush Marks," Schenectady Gazette, August 29, 1985
Johnson, Ken, "Chesterwood: An Outdoor Gallery of Art," Albany Times Union, August 25, 1985
Russell, Gloria, "Sculpture and Nature in Harmony at Chesterwood," Springfield Sunday Republican, July 7, 1985
Bonenti, Charles, "Sculpture at Chesterwood," Berkshire Eagle, July 22, 1982, p.21
Bell, Winifred, "A Perfect Sculpture Setting," Berkshire Eagle, October 4, 1979, p.11
Pasquine, Ruth, "Sculpture on Display at BCC," Berkshire Eagle, October 3, 1979, p.4
Hawkins, Stephen, "Chatham Sculptor Creating Work to be Placed at HVCC," Berkshire Eagle, December 22, 1975, p.34
"East Chatham Sculptor's Design Fabricated at Stephentown Plant," The Echo, December 20, 1975, p.1
Dicker, Fredric U., "HVCC Sculpture Accepted Reluctantly," The Times Union, July 2, 1975, p.3
Shirey, David L., "Paramus Sculpture Show Covers Half-Mile," New York Times, June 30, 1971, p.30
Baro, Gene, "Decisive Art Collection of the Barton G. Tremains," Vogue, February 1969, p.132
Design in Steel Awards Catalog, 1969, p.42
Battock, Gregory, ed., Minimal Art, A Critical Anthology, New York: E. P. Dutton, 1968, pp.165–174
House Beautiful, November 1968
"Art World Hails Antoni Milkowski," Polish American Journal, April 13, 1968, p.6
Time magazine, October 13, 1967, p.81
Glueck, Grace, "Sculpfest,," New York Times, June 25, 1967, p.23
Glueck, Grace, "New York Gallery Notes," Art in America, May/June 1967, pp.114,116
"Lost Leonardos," Newsweek, February 27, 1967, p.98
Glueck, Grace, "On the Whole, It's Avant Garde," New York Times, January 28, 1967, p.C23
Goossen, E. C., "Distillation: A Joint Showing," Artforum, November 1966, p.32
Browne, Rackstraw, "Reviews and Previews," Artnews, Summer 1966, p.64
Kwiatowski, Gerard, "We are Optimistic," Poland Illustrated Magazine, January 1966, p.7

References

External links
Hunter College
Hofstra University Outdoor Sculpture Park Retrieved March 2015.
New York Times: Art in Review Antoni Milkowski Retrieved March 2015. 
Observer Antoni Milkowski
NYC Parks Belleview South Park Retrieved March 2015.
Paid Notice, DEATHS, Milkowski, Antoni  Retrieved June 2016.
Susan Hartung Obituary  Retrieved June 2016.

Artists from Evanston, Illinois
Kenyon College alumni
Columbia University alumni
United States Marines
University of California, Berkeley alumni
Hunter College alumni
Hunter College faculty
1935 births
2001 deaths
Artists from New York City
American people of Polish descent
Sculptors from New York (state)
Sculptors from Illinois